was a Japanese aircraft/automotive engineer. He graduated from Tokyo Imperial University in 1936 and joined Nakajima Aircraft Company in the same year.

Career
He improved Nakajima Sakae engine for Mitsubishi A6M Zero, Nakajima Ki-43 and other planes. He was the chief designer of Nakajima Homare engine for Nakajima Ki-84, Nakajima C6N, Kawanishi N1K and others.

After World War II, Nakajima Aircraft Company was disbanded and was banned from producing aircraft by the GHQ. It was divided into 12 companies. Two of them were Fuji Heavy Industries (Subaru) and Fuji Precision Industries (Prince Motors). Nakagawa was appointed the senior engineering manager of Prince and led its engineers. He supervised all the Prince vehicles projects including Skyline, Gloria, R380, S390P-1 Royal limousine and others.

He received a Doctorate of Engineering from his old school Tokyo University in 1961.

After the merger of Prince and Nissan in August 1966, he was promoted to the senior executive director of Nissan in 1969.

Later he became the chairman of the Society of Automotive Engineers of Japan, Inc. (JSAE). He was elected to the National Academy of Engineering in 1990.

He died on July 30, 1998.

See also

Nakajima Aircraft Company
Nakajima Sakae
Nakajima Homare
Mitsubishi A6M Zero
Nakajima Ki-43
Nakajima Ki-84
Nakajima C6N
Kawanishi N1K
Prince Motor Company
Prince G engine
Prince Skyline
Prince Gloria
Prince R380
Prince Royal
Jiro Tanaka
Shinichiro Sakurai
Nissan
Nissan S20 engine
Nissan R382

References 

1913 births
1998 deaths
Japanese automotive pioneers
Japanese aerospace engineers
Japanese automotive engineers
Japanese founders of automobile manufacturers
Nissan people
Businesspeople from Tokyo
University of Tokyo alumni
Japanese business executives
Corporate executives in the automobile industry